, called Tajima the arrow-cutter, was a sōhei (warrior monk) from Mii-dera who fought alongside the Minamoto clan forces, and many of his fellow Mii-dera monks at the Battle of Uji in 1180.

The bridge over the Yodo River was torn up by Tajima's fellow sōhei, but the attacking Taira clan forces were still shooting arrows, and were still threatening to cross the river. Tajima is said to have stood upon the bridge and, spinning his naginata, deflected many if not most of the arrows that came his way.

According to The Tale of the Heike,

Citations

References

Japanese warrior monks
Heian period Buddhist clergy
Samurai
People of Heian-period Japan
Year of birth unknown
Year of death unknown
12th-century Japanese people